Edelweiss was a Swiss monthly women's magazine published in Zürich, Switzerland. The magazine was part of Ringier. It was among the best-selling women's magazines of Switzerland. It was in circulation between 1998 and 2015.

History and profile
Edelweiss was launched by the media company Ringier Romandy in 1998. The magazine was published on a monthly basis. It was headquartered in Zurich and was printed in German. Later its headquarters was moved to Lausanne.

Laurence Desbordes was appointed editor in chief in 2005. In 2008 a sister magazine of Edelweiss, Edelweiss Men, was started. In 2013 Edelweiss sold 19,048 copies. In 2014 its readers were 62,000.

In May 2014 Alexandre Lanz was named as the editor-in-chief of the magazine. In 2015 Edelweiss merged into Bolero, its sister magazine.

References

1998 establishments in Switzerland
2015 disestablishments in Switzerland
Defunct magazines published in Switzerland
German-language magazines
Magazines established in 1998
Magazines disestablished in 2015
Magazines published in Zürich
Mass media in Lausanne
Monthly magazines published in Switzerland
Women's magazines published in Switzerland